The New Zealand national cricket team toured India in  1969-70 season. The two teams played three Tests. Test series drawn 1-1. When India were bowled out for 89 runs on the last day of the third Test, the crowd reacted by throwing stones at the police and starting fires within the ground.

Test matches

1st Test

2nd Test

3rd Test

References

External links
 Cricarchive
 Tour page CricInfo
 Record CricInfo

1969 in Indian cricket
1969 in New Zealand cricket
Indian cricket seasons from 1945–46 to 1969–70
International cricket competitions from 1960–61 to 1970
1969-70